Awateria is a genus of sea snails, marine gastropod mollusks in the family Borsoniidae. Most species in this genus have become extinct.

Description
In general shape and sculpture the type of this genus is reminiscent of Arcularia Link, 1807 (synonym of Nassarius Duméril, 1805), the protoconch is comparatively large. The fasciole runs between the wreath of subsutural nodules and the upright ribs. The canal is short, wide, and effuse. From Epideira Hedley, 1918, to which, it seems to be related, the larger protoconch, few and rapidly increasing whorls, the subcylindrical form and the shallow sinus of Awateria readily distinguish it.

Species
Species within the genus Awateria include:
 Awateria crossei (Smith E. A., 1891)
 † Awateria defossa Powell, 1942 
 † Awateria echinata Powell, 1942 
 † Awateria evanida Suter, 1917 
 Awateria hoylei (Smith E. A., 1891)
 † Awateria karakaensis Marwick, 1931 
 † Awateria marwicki Powell, 1942 
 † Awateria miocenica Vella, 1954 
 Awateria optabilis (Murdoch & Suter, 1906)
 † Awateria retiolata L. C. King, 1933 
 † Awateria streptophora Suter, 1917 
 † Awateria striata Vella, 1954 
 † Awateria thomsoni Powell, 1942 
 † Awateria wairoaensis Powell, 1942 
 Awateria watsoni (Smith E. A., 1891)
 Species brought into synonymy
 † Awateria aliena Marwick, 1965 : synonym of † Taranis aliena (Marwick, 1965)  (original combination)
 Awateria challengeri (Smith E. A., 1891): synonym of Belomitra challengeri (E. A. Smith, 1891)
 † Awateria expalliata Laws, 1947: synonym of † Mioawateria expalliata (Laws, 1947)
 † Awateria experta Laws, 1947: synonym of † Awheaturris experta (Laws, 1947) (original combination)
 † Awateria mollyae L. C. King, 1933: synonym of † Awateria retiolata L. C. King, 1933 (synonym)
 † Awateria personata Powell, 1942: synonym of † Mioawateria personata (Powell, 1942)

References

 Suter, New Zealand Geological Survey, Pal. Bull. No. 5, Pt. I., 1917

External links
 P. Vella, Tertiary Mollusca from south-east Wairarapa; Transactions of the Royal Society of New Zealand, 1954
  Spencer H.G., Willan R.C., Marshall B.A. & Murray T.J. (2011) Checklist of the Recent Mollusca Recorded from the New Zealand Exclusive Economic Zone
  Bouchet P., Kantor Yu.I., Sysoev A. & Puillandre N. (2011) A new operational classification of the Conoidea. Journal of Molluscan Studies 77: 273-308.